Phaonia palpata is a species of fly which is distributed across parts of the Palaearctic.

References

Muscidae
Diptera of Europe
Insects described in 1897
Taxa named by Paul Stein